Brad Milne (born 17 March 1974) is a South African former field hockey player who competed in the 1996 Summer Olympics.

References

External links

1974 births
Living people
South African male field hockey players
Olympic field hockey players of South Africa
Field hockey players at the 1996 Summer Olympics
Field hockey players at the 1998 Commonwealth Games
Commonwealth Games competitors for South Africa